Tseren-Ochiryn Dambadorj (1898 – June 25, 1934) was a Mongolian politician who served as Chairman of the Mongolian People's Revolutionary Party from 1921 to 1928. He was expelled from the party in 1928 for his rightist policies and died in Moscow, USSR in 1934.

Born in Niislel Khüree in 1898, Dambadorj attended Manchu and Russian Interpreter's School in the capital before moving onto the Russian gynamsium and then secondary school in Troitskosavsk.  He joined the Mongolian People's Party (MPP) in 1921, was acting chairman of the MPP Central Committee in March 1921.  After the Outer Mongolian Revolution of 1921 he was elected vice chairman (January to March 1922) and then chairman of the MPP Central Committee from March 15, 1922, to January 12, 1923, and again from August 31, 1924, to October 27, 1928.

At the Third Party Congress in 1924, Dambadorj along with leftist leader Rinchingiin Elbegdorj, led calls for the arrest and execution of moderate party leader Soliin Danzan, accusing him of representing bourgeois interests and engaging in business with Chinese firms.  Following Danzan's death, Dambadorj and the party's right wing assumed control of the party (renamed the Mongolian People's Revolutionary Party)  and promoted rightist policies mirroring Lenin's New Economic Policy in the Soviet Union.

In 1924-1925 Dambadorj undertook a mission to Europe ostensibly to promote the activities of the Institute of Science and Letters but in reality to establish contacts with French and German governments.  Efforts by Dambadorj and others within the party to expand international recognition of Mongolia's independence only served to enrage the Soviets who grew increasingly suspicious of the party leader's allegiances.

Dambadorj confirmed these suspicions by making statements such as "the elimination of capital and the confiscation of capital of the old feudal nobility...are incompatible with the government's policies."  He often expressed concern about creeping Soviet imperialism even while opponents such as Khorloogiin Choibalsan praised the USSR as Mongolia's closest friend."

The Soviets finally moved to purge Dambadorj and other rightwingers at the Seventh Party Congress in 1928. The rise of Josef Stalin in the Soviet Union ushered in a "Leftist Period" in the Mongolian People's Republic wherein the party pushed more rapid collectivization, land expropriation, and persecution of the Buddhist Clergy.  "Rightwingers" such as Dambadorj, Ajvaagiin Danzan, Tseveen Jamsrano, and N. Jadamba, all of whom had played a role in what was later called "the Period of Rightist Opportunity", were expelled from the party.

Dambadorj was sent to Moscow as a trade representative attached to the Mongolian Embassy there.  He died on June 25, 1934, in what some suspect was a result of poisoning.

Notes

1898 births
1932 deaths
Mongolian People's Party politicians
People from Ulaanbaatar